Claudio Cipolla (born 11 February 1955, in Goito) is an Italian bishop of the Catholic Church. He has been Bishop of Padua since 18 October 2015.

Biography
Cipolla was ordained priest in the Diocese of Mantua on 24 May 1980.

When he was appointed Bishop of Padua, Cipolla was pastor in Porto Mantovano and episcopal vicar of the Diocese of Mantua.

He was a scout leader and assistant of the Association of Italian Catholic Guides and Scouts.

He was ordained bishop on 27 September 2015 and consequently installed in Padua on 18 October 2015.

References

1955 births
20th-century Italian Roman Catholic bishops
Bishops of Padua
Living people
Clergy from the Province of Mantua